The River Sessions may refer to:

 The River Sessions (Gun album), 2006
 The River Sessions (Magnum album), 2004
 The River Sessions (Bert Jansch album), 2004